Holger Nikelis (born 15 January 1978) is a German table tennis player. He won a gold medal in the singles event and a bronze in the team event at the 2004 Summer Paralympics. He has also won other medals and championships in disabled table tennis. He was world number one in his category in September 2013.

References

External links 

 
 
  
  
  

1978 births
Living people
German male table tennis players
Paralympic table tennis players of Germany
Paralympic gold medalists for Germany
Paralympic bronze medalists for Germany
Paralympic medalists in table tennis
Table tennis players at the 2004 Summer Paralympics
Table tennis players at the 2012 Summer Paralympics
Medalists at the 2004 Summer Paralympics
Medalists at the 2012 Summer Paralympics
Sportspeople from Cologne
20th-century German people